Shatoujiao is a subdistrict of Yantian District, Shenzhen, Guangdong, China, located on the border of Shenzhen and Hong Kong. The population is mainly composed of migrant workers from all parts of China along with a small number of Russians. Shatoujiao is a port with cargo coming into and exiting Yantian. It has a road connecting to Luohu, with regular bus services to Shenzhen's main train terminus and through connections to Guangzhou. The subdistrict lies near a highway that links to Meixian and Chaozhou while the Shenzhen railway is also part of the transport links between Hong Kong and Beijing.

English Name
In Hong Kong, the name Shatoujiao is written as Sha Tau Kok, reflecting the Cantonese pronunciation. Although Shatoujiao and Sha Tau Kok are written using the same Chinese characters, today, 'Shatoujiao usually refers to the town on the mainland side of the border, while Sha Tau Kok'' refers to the town on the Hong Kong side.

Economy

Development Zone
 Shenzhen Shatoujiao Free Trade Zone
Established in 1987, Shenzhen Shatoujiao Free Trade Zone was one of the first free trade zones in China approved by the State Council. It is only  from Yantian Port. Industries encouraged in the zone include shipping, warehousing and logistics.

Minsk World 

Minsk World was a military theme park that operated in Shatoujiao between 2000 and 2016. It was centered on the Soviet aircraft carrier Minsk, which functioned as a museum.

Chung Ying Street

Chung Ying Street divides Shatoujiao and Sha Tau Kok, Hong Kong.

See also 
Sha Tau Kok, Hong Kong side of the same settlement divided by the leasing New Territories to Britain in 1899

References 

Subdistricts of Shenzhen
Divided cities
Yantian District